The Chinese water dragon (Physignathus cocincinus) is a species of agamid lizard native to China and mainland Southeast Asia. It is also known as the Asian water dragon, Thai water dragon, and green water dragon. The genus name is Greek for "inflated jaw".

Taxonomy
The species and genus were first described by Georges Cuvier in 1829. The epithet cocincinus is from the French term , for the type locality Cochin-china (Vietnam). Physignathus means 'inflated jaw'. 

During the 19th and 20th centuries, several other species of agamid lizards were placed in Cuvier's genus Physignathus. These have been reclassified into separate genera, leaving Physignathus with only the original species P. cocincinus remaining. For example, the Australian water dragon Intellagama lesueurii was formerly P. lesueurii.

Description
Chinese water dragons can grow up to 36" (0.9m) in total length, including tail, and can live from 10 to 15 years. 

Coloration ranges from dark to light green, or sometimes purple with an orange stomach. Diagonal stripes of green or turquoise are found on the body, while the tail is banded from the middle to the end with green and white. Their undersides range from white, off white, very pale green, or pale yellow.  But their throats are considered to be more attractive, which can be quite colorful (blue and purple, or peach), some with a single color, some with stripes. Adult males have larger, more triangular heads than females, and develop larger crests on the head, neck and tail, and are larger in general. The tail, slightly over two-thirds of the entire body length, can be used as a weapon, for balance, and to assist swimming.

Like many other reptiles the Chinese water dragon possesses a small, iridescent, photosensitive spot between their eyes referred to as the pineal eye (or parietal eye, or colloquially as the third eye) that is thought to help thermoregulate their bodies by sensing differences in light to assist with basking and seeking shelter after sunset. Since it recognizes differences in light, the parietal eye can also help the lizard avoid predation from birds and other aerial threats, and can awaken from deep sleep from even slight changes in light from overhead. These animals are very docile and allow physical activity.

Habitat and behaviors 

Native to the lowland and highland forests of southern China and southeastern Asia (Thailand, Vietnam, Laos, Cambodia and Burma), Chinese water dragons are most commonly found along the banks of freshwater lakes and streams. Water dragons live in areas with average humidity levels of 40–80% and temperatures ranging from 80–90 °F (26–32 °C).

They are active during the day (diurnal), and spend most of their time in the trees or plants (arboreal). If threatened, the dragon will drop from the trees into the water and either swim to safety or remain submerged for up to 90 minutes.

Diet

Though they will also eat vegetation, the diet of the water dragon consists mainly of insects, supplemented with an occasional small fish, mammal, bird, reptile or egg. Mollusks and small crustaceans are also part of their diet.

Reproduction
Chinese water dragons normally reproduce sexually, but sometimes reproduce by parthenogenesis instead.

Invasive species
Chinese water dragons have established themselves in Hong Kong, probably from released pet animals.

Gallery

References

External links

Care for Chinese water dragon
Chinese water dragon care sheet

Agamidae
Reptiles of Myanmar
Reptiles of Cambodia
Reptiles of China
Reptiles of Laos
Reptiles of Southeast Asia
Reptiles of Thailand
Reptiles of Vietnam
Reptiles described in 1829
Taxa named by Georges Cuvier